The Governors of Singapore were the political leaders of Singapore during its pre-independence phase in the history of Singapore.

Residents of Singapore (1819–1826)
The Resident of Singapore ruled the British colony that is today the Republic of Singapore. The persons on this position governed Singapore from 1819 to 1826, on behalf of the British East India Company.

Governors of the Straits Settlements (1826–1942)

The Governor of the Straits Settlements ruled the Straits Settlements. The persons on this position governed the Straits Settlements from 1826 to 1946, on behalf of the British East India Company (1826–1858), the India Office (1858–1867) and the Colonial Office (1867–1946) respectively.

Japanese occupation (1942 to 1945)
During the Japanese occupation of Singapore, there were two Mayors and five Military Administrators appointed to Syonan-to.

Governors of the Straits Settlements (1945–1946)

Governors of Singapore (1946–1959)
The Governor of Singapore governs Singapore. The persons on this position governed the Colony of Singapore from 1946 to 1959, on behalf of the Colonial Office until Singapore gained self-governance in 1959 in where the Office of the Governor was abolished.

See also
 Chief Secretary, Singapore
 Governor of North Borneo
 History of Malaysia
 History of Singapore
 Legislative Council of Singapore
 Legislative Council of the Straits Settlements
 List of Chief Secretaries of Singapore
 President of Singapore
 Prime Minister of Singapore
 Yang di-Pertuan Negara

References

Further reading
 
 
WorldStatesmen - Singapore
Historical Dictionary of Singapore (Justin Corfield) 

 
Singapore
British rule in Singapore
Lists of political office-holders in Singapore

Political office-holders in Singapore